Yaseen Khalil Abdullah al-Sheyadi (born 5 February 1994), commonly known as Yaseen al-Sheyadi, is an Omani footballer who plays for Al-Suwaiq Club.

Club career
On 8 August 2014, he signed a one-year contract with Al-Suwaiq Club.

Club career statistics

International career
Yaseen was selected for the national team for the first time in 2014. He made his first appearance for Oman on 30 May 2015, in a friendly match against Bahrain. He has represented the national team in the 2014 WAFF Championship.

References

External links
 
 
 
 
 

1994 births
Living people
Omani footballers
Oman international footballers
Association football midfielders
Suwaiq Club players
Oman Professional League players
Footballers at the 2014 Asian Games
2019 AFC Asian Cup players
Asian Games competitors for Oman